The Mistress of Treves is a 1952 historical drama film directed by Arthur Maria Rabenalt and starring Rossano Brazzi, Anne Vernon and Gianni Santuccio. Made as a co-production between France, Italy and West Germany, it was filmed at the Icet Studios in Milan and on location in the Aosta Valley. It is based on the legend of Genevieve of Brabant and is set during the time of the Crusades.

Cast

References

Bibliography

External links
 

1952 films
1950s Italian-language films
Films directed by Arthur Maria Rabenalt
West German films
1950s historical drama films
French historical drama films
Italian historical drama films
German historical films
Films set in the 13th century
Films scored by Giovanni Fusco
Italian black-and-white films
French black-and-white films
1950s Italian films
1950s French films
1950s German films